Paul McCarthy (born 1945) is an American contemporary artist.

Paul McCarthy may also refer to:

Paul McCarthy (footballer) (1971–2017), Irish footballer
Paul McCarthy (actor) (born 1967), Australian comedy actor
Paul McCarthy (rugby union), Irish rugby union player and coach

See also
 Paul McCartney (born 1942), English singer-songwriter, musician and composer